Bissell Street Water Tower (also known as the "New Red" tower) is a historic standpipe water tower located at the junction of Bissell Street and Blair Avenue in St. Louis, Missouri. The tower was completed in 1886 and was in service until 1912. It is one of three remaining historic standpipes in Saint Louis, along with the Grand Avenue Water Tower and the Compton Hill Water Tower.

See also
 College Hill, St. Louis
 Chicago Water Tower
 Louisville Water Tower
 National Register of Historic Places listings in St. Louis north and west of downtown

References

Water towers on the National Register of Historic Places in Missouri
Towers completed in 1885
Water towers in Missouri
National Register of Historic Places in St. Louis
Buildings and structures in St. Louis
1886 establishments in Missouri